Travis Scott Tartamella (born December 17, 1987) is an American former Major League Baseball (MLB) catcher who played for the St. Louis Cardinals in 2015.

Amateur career
Tartamella attended Los Osos High School in Rancho Cucamonga, California.  He enrolled at Pepperdine University, and played college baseball for the Pepperdine Waves.  After two seasons with Pepperdine, Tartamella transferred to California State University, Los Angeles, where he continued his college career with the Cal State Los Angeles Golden Eagles. In 2007 and 2008, he played collegiate summer baseball with the Orleans Cardinals of the Cape Cod Baseball League.

Professional career
The Cardinals selected Tartamella in the 19th round of the 2009 MLB draft.  Baseball America rated him as the "Best Defensive Catcher" in the Cardinals minor league system in 2014.

On September 21, 2015, the Cardinals purchased Tartamella's contract, promoting him to the major leagues, following an injury to starting catcher Yadier Molina.  Tartamella debuted in the eighth inning against the Cincinnati Reds on September 23 in a 10–2 win and singled on the first pitch of his first plate appearance.

References

External links

1987 births
Living people
People from Fontana, California
Baseball players from California
Major League Baseball catchers
St. Louis Cardinals players
Pepperdine Waves baseball players
Orleans Firebirds players
Cal State Los Angeles Golden Eagles baseball players
Johnson City Cardinals players
Palm Beach Cardinals players
Springfield Cardinals players
Memphis Redbirds players